Farnworth is a town and an unparished area in the Metropolitan Borough of Bolton, Greater Manchester, England.  It contains 14 listed buildings that are recorded in the National Heritage List for England.  All the listed buildings are designated at Grade II, the lowest of the three grades, which is applied to "buildings of national importance and special interest".  The area is mainly residential, and the listed buildings include churches and associated structures, two former cotton mills, a railway bridge and a tunnel, a former toll house, a public library, a town hall, a former country house, a war memorial, and a public house.


Buildings

References

Citations

Sources

Lists of listed buildings in Greater Manchester
Buildings and structures in the Metropolitan Borough of Bolton
Listed